The Tellem were the people who inhabited the Bandiagara Escarpment. Tellem may also refer to:

 Arn Tellem (born 1954), player agent
 Nancy Tellem (born 1952), American businesswoman
 Soulja Boy Tellem (born 1990), American rapper, songwriter, record producer, actor, streamer, and entrepreneur